The Tennessee Highway Patrol (THP) is the State Patrol organization for the U.S. state of Tennessee, responsible for enforcing all federal and state laws relating to traffic on the state's federal and state highways. The agency was created to protect the lives, property, and constitutional rights of people in Tennessee. The THP is a division of the Tennessee Department of Safety and Homeland Security.

The Tennessee Highway Patrol provides assistance to motorists who need help. It investigates traffic accidents involving property damage, personal injury, or death. The agency works with prosecutors in the prosecution of cases in which the use of drugs or alcohol contributed to accidents causing personal injury or fatalities. In addition to traffic law enforcement, the Tennessee Highway Patrol has responsibility in criminal interdiction, which involves the suppression of narcotics on the state's roads and highways, including Interstate Highways. It is the agency responsible for conducting background checks on applicants for permits to carry handguns.

History
The Tennessee Highway Patrol came into existence on December 14, 1929, to replace the unpopular Tennessee State Police Force, which had been created in 1926 and had been patterned after the Texas Rangers to obtain fees and taxes from citizens. In 1957, the Tennessee Highway Patrol became the first police agency in the United States to utilize helicopters in patrol work.

Administration
The head of the Tennessee Highway Patrol is Colonel Matt Perry, who has served with the organization since 2004 and has served as the head of Tennessee Highway Patrol since December 2020. The THP is headquartered in Nashville, the state capital. The agency's  field operations are organized geographically into eight districts, each with a district headquarters and a varying number of troops (stations that are usually grouped with adjacent counties). As of September 2007, the Tennessee Highway Patrol was authorized to have up to 947 commissioned troopers.

The Tennessee Highway Patrol operates six inspection sites around the state, in Districts 1, 2, 3, 4, 5, and 7. The Tennessee Highway Patrol's enforcement activities at the inspection sites, also called scale complexes, include inspections of commercial vehicles and driver logs, highway patrols with a focus on traffic violations by trucks, and weighing of commercial vehicles, both at permanent inspection stations on Interstate highways and with portable scales.

Organization
The Tennessee Highway Patrol is organized into eight districts, which have a district headquarters, a varying number of troops, and county facilities. The table below indicates the district, the troops in each region, the counties in each district and troop, and the locations of the district headquarters and inspection facilities (called scale complexes). With the extensive coverage of THP facilities, the Tennessee Highway Patrol therefore has a presence in each of Tennessee's 95 counties.

Criminal Investigation Division
The Criminal Investigation Division of the Tennessee Highway Patrol investigates, gathers evidence, and assists federal, state, and local law enforcement, when requested. It also handles background checks for handgun carry permits.
 Handgun Carry Permits
 Identity Theft Information

Commercial Vehicle Enforcement Division
The Commercial Vehicle Enforcement Division of the Tennessee Highway Patrol inspects commercial vehicles and driver logs, weighs commercial vehicles, and patrols highways with a focus on truck traffic violations. Troop S in District 3 conducts all the below programs in addition to the D.A.R.E. program: 
 District Offices
 New Entrant Program
 A.C.E.S.
 Pupil Transportation

Special Operations Unit
The Special Operations Unit of the Tennessee Highway Patrol consists of four specialized sections: 
 Aviation section, which comprises four pilots, one mechanic, five Jet Ranger helicopters, and one Huey UH-1H,
 Tactical/Scuba divers/Bomb Squad,
 K-9 section, and
 the Governor's Task Force on Marijuana Eradication.
 Facility Protection Unit

Uniform and equipment

The design of the shoulder patch of the THP is unique, as it is the only State Police shoulder patch to identify the admittance of the state into the Union. Tennessee was the 16th state admitted in the Union; therefore the shoulder patch has a Roman numeral 16 displayed on it.

The uniform of the THP consists of a tan uniform shirt with forest green epaulets and pocket flaps.  Long sleeves with a forest green tie is worn during the winter months while short sleeves with an open collar is worn during the summer months.  Collar ornaments that have the letters "T.H.P" are worn on the collars of both seasonal uniform shirts.  The uniform pant is forest green with a wide black stripe.  The uniform hat is a forest green campaign style hat.  A felt version is worn with the winter uniform while a straw version is worn with the summer uniform.  A miniaturized version of the breast badge is worn as a hat badge while higher ranks display their insignia of rank on the uniform hat.  A silver or gold (Depending on Rank) cord with acorns is worn at the base of the hat.

The THP utilizes a unique duty belt.  Instead of the standard  duty belt worn by most agencies, the THP utilizes a  clarino (Patent High Gloss) leather duty belt, creating a distinctive look.  All other accessories on the belt are also clarino and feature hidden snap closures.  The belt buckle is silver for troopers and gold for higher ranks.

The issued sidearm for THP Troopers is the Glock Model 45 chambered in 9x19mm. Also THP troopers wear bulletproof vests under their uniform shirt. Less lethal weapons issued to troopers include OC Pepper Spray and the Expandable Straight Baton.

Fallen officers
Since the organization was established, 42 members of the Tennessee Highway Patrol have died in the line of duty.

See also

 List of law enforcement agencies in Tennessee
 State police
 State patrol
 Highway patrol

References

External links
 Tennessee Highway Patrol

Government agencies established in 1929
State law enforcement agencies of Tennessee
State agencies of Tennessee
1929 establishments in Tennessee